Sugarfoot is an American Western television series that aired for 69 episodes on ABC from 1957-1961 on Tuesday nights on a "shared" slot basis – rotating with Cheyenne (first season); Cheyenne and Bronco (second season); and Bronco (third season). The Warner Bros. production stars Will Hutchins as Tom Brewster, an Easterner who comes to the Oklahoma Territory to become a lawyer. Brewster was a correspondence-school student whose apparent lack of cowboy skills earned him the nickname "Sugarfoot", a designation even below that of a tenderfoot.

Hutchins was the only regular on the show.  In four episodes, Hutchins also plays the dual role of Abram Thomas, a.k.a. "The Canary Kid", leader of an outlaw gang who is a dead ringer for Brewster.  In each of these episodes, Brewster is joined in the fight against The Canary Kid's plans by Christopher Colt—i.e., Wayde Preston crossing over from his role in the simultaneously-produced WB series Colt .45.  Towards the very end of the run, Jack Elam was cast in two of the final five episodes as Brewster's occasional sidekick Toothy Thompson, but the series was cancelled shortly thereafter.

Background
Sugarfoot had no relation to the 1951 Randolph Scott Western film Sugarfoot aside from the studio owning the title (and the theme music), but its pilot episode was a remake of a 1954 Western film called The Boy from Oklahoma starring Will Rogers, Jr., as Tom Brewster. The pilot and premiere episode, "Brannigan's Boots", was so similar to The Boy from Oklahoma that Sheb Wooley and Slim Pickens reprised their roles from the film.

As played by Rogers in the film, Brewster carried no gun, disliked firearms in general, and vanquished villains with his roping skills (à la Will Rogers) if friendly persuasion failed. Perhaps for practical reasons, the pilot altered the character slightly and made Brewster more like the typical Western hero—reluctant to use guns (or any other kind of violence), but able and willing to do so if necessary. That remained his stance throughout the series, and the title song mentions that Sugarfoot carries a rifle and a law book.

Whenever he enters a saloon, Sugarfoot refuses liquor and orders sarsaparilla "with a dash of cherry". (Sarsaparilla is a drink similar to root beer, both of which are non-alcohol-based.)

Sugarfoot was one of the earliest products of the alliance between ABC and the fledgling Warner Bros. Television Department, chaired by William T. Orr. During the same period, other similar programs  appeared, including Maverick, Cheyenne, Bronco, Lawman, and Colt .45.  Hutchins appeared as Sugarfoot in crossover episodes of Cheyenne and Maverick, and in an installment of Bronco called "The Yankee Tornado" with Peter Breck as a young Theodore Roosevelt. Jack Kelly appeared as Bart Maverick in the Sugarfoot episode "A Price on His Head".

Sugarfoot is only partly set in Oklahoma; the character seems to appear at any place in the West, though geographic place names are often missing in the scripts. He often journeys south of the border into Mexico, and numerous episodes are rich in Hispanic culture, with various roles played by Mexican or Mexican-American actors.

Cast

Cast of "Brannigan's Boots"
 Will Hutchins as Tom 'Sugarfoot' Brewster
 Merry Anders as Katie Brannigan
 Louis Jean Heydt as Paul Evans
 Dennis Hopper as Billy the Kid
 Arthur Hunnicutt as Pop Purty
 Chubby Johnson as Postmaster Wally Higgins
 Slim Pickens as Shorty
 Ainslie Pryor as Mayor Barney Turlock
 Sheb Wooley as Pete

Cast of The Boy from Oklahoma film (1954)
 Will Rogers, Jr. as Sheriff Tom Brewster
 Nancy Olson as Katie Brannigan
 Lon Chaney, Jr. as Crazy Charlie
 Anthony Caruso as Mayor Barney Turlock
 Wallace Ford as Postmaster Wally Higgins
 Clem Bevans as Pop Pruty, Justice of the Peace
 Merv Griffin as Steve
 Louis Jean Heydt as Paul Evans
 Sheb Wooley as Pete Martin
 Slim Pickens as Shorty
 Tyler MacDuff as Billy the Kid
 James Griffith as Joe Downey

Guest stars

Rico Alaniz
Chris Alcaide
Roscoe Ates
Rayford Barnes
Fred Beir
Russ Bender
Charles Bronson
Joe Brooks
Ahna Capri
Albert Carrier
Ronnie Dapo
Janet De Gore
Richard Devon
Dick Elliott
Bill Erwin
Dean Fredericks
Richard Garland
Sean Garrison
Don Gordon
Kevin Hagen
Harry Holcombe
Rodolfo Hoyos Jr.
Clegg Hoyt
Gary Hunley
Douglas Kennedy
Jess Kirkpatrick
Nolan Leary
Dayton Lummis
Donald May
Ken Mayer
Patrick McVey
James Millhollin

Ewing Mitchell
Neyle Morrow
Jay Novello
Cathy O'Donnell
Gregg Palmer
Michael Pate
James Philbrook
John M. Pickard
Slim Pickens
Stuart Randall
Richard Reeves
Suzanne Storrs
Kent Taylor
Kelly Thordsen
Gary Vinson
John Vivyan
Gregory Walcott
Patrick Waltz
Efrem Zimbalist, Jr.

Episodes

Season 1: 1957–58

Season 2: 1958–59

Season 3: 1959–60

Season 4: 1960–61

Background and production

After several episodes aired in the second season, a disappointed Hutchins complained in a letter to executive director William T. Orr that the scripts were written so that the lead character Sugarfoot was not particularly needed in many of the episodes. The action revolved around Sugarfoot who was often not a real party to the events. Hutchins attributed writer and director Montgomery Pittman for saving the series for two more seasons by setting the tone for the redirection of the latter scripts. Pittman directed four episodes and wrote four others.

Wayde Preston, who played Christopher Colt on the ABC western Colt .45, appeared four times in that same role on Sugarfoot in the episodes dealing with "The Canary Kid," a role also played by Will Hutchins.

Reception

Sugarfoot finished at #24 in the Nielsen ratings for the 1957-1958 season and #21 for 1958-1959.

Release

Home media
Warner Bros. has released all four seasons on MOD (manufacture on demand) DVD-R's in Region 1 via their Warner Archive Collection.

In popular culture
 In an episode of Arrested Development titled "Spring Breakout", Sugarfoot is mentioned and the theme song is presented.
 The series debuted in 1958 in the United Kingdom but only in the Midlands area. In 1960, it was aired nationally in the UK by the BBC, at which point it was renamed Tenderfoot despite the fact that it kept the theme song which refers to the character as "Sugarfoot". After 1964, the series returned to ITV, this time not just restricted to the Midlands, where it was once again billed under its original name.
 The animated television series King of the Hill features a barbecue restaurant named "Sugarfoot's".

References

External links 
 
Roy Huggins' Archive of American Television Interview

1957 American television series debuts
1961 American television series endings
American Broadcasting Company original programming
Black-and-white American television shows
English-language television shows
Live action television shows based on films
Television series by Warner Bros. Television Studios
1950s Western (genre) television series
1960s Western (genre) television series
Television series about lawyers
Television shows set in Oklahoma